Amantis is a genus of praying mantises native to Asia and the islands of the Pacific Ocean.

Amantis may also refer to:

 Confessio Amantis ("The Lover's Confession"),  a 33,000-line Middle English poem by John Gower
 Lachrimæ Amantis ("A Lover's tears"), a pavan by Dowland in 1604 from Lachrimae, or Seaven Teares
 Paragigagnathus amantis, a species of mite

See also
 Amanti (disambiguation)